Educational Television Stations was a division of the National Association of Educational Broadcasters (NAEB), created at the association's 1963 convention in the United States. The new division had the following responsibilities:

 Activation and development of new educational television stations.
 Representation of stations before government and private agencies.
 Compilation of data regarding fund-raising activities.
 Facilitating personnel training and placement programs.
 Holding regional and national conferences
 Establishment of an educational television (ETV) program library service – formed the Educational Television Stations Program Service in 1965

Educational Television Stations merged with the newly reorganized Public Broadcasting Service (PBS) in 1973.

See also 
 America's Public Television Stations: A similar group founded in 1979

1963 establishments in the United States
1973 disestablishments in the United States
Public Broadcasting Service
Organizations disestablished in 1973
Television organizations in the United States
Trade associations based in the United States